Itmann Company Store and Office is a historic commercial building located at Itmann, Wyoming County, West Virginia. It was designed by architect Alex B. Mahood and built in 1923–1925.  It is a Classical Revival style complex built of native sandstone.  It consists of four sections (A through D) laid out in an open courtyard plan.  Sections A and C are 2 1/2-story parapeted gable front sections located on the northern and southern sides of the courtyard and Section D is a 1-story parapeted half gable roofed loggia.  It was built as a company store for the local mining community.

It was listed on the National Register of Historic Places in 1990.

References

Alex B. Mahood buildings
Office buildings completed in 1923
Buildings and structures in Wyoming County, West Virginia
Neoclassical architecture in West Virginia
Commercial buildings on the National Register of Historic Places in West Virginia
National Register of Historic Places in Wyoming County, West Virginia
Company stores in the United States